Retreat Halt railway station was on the Great Northern Railway (Ireland) in Northern Ireland.

The Great Northern Railway (Ireland) opened the station on 1 November 1936.

It closed on 10 October 1957.

Routes

Reopening of Portadown to Armagh

References

Disused railway stations in County Armagh
Railway stations opened in 1936
Railway stations closed in 1957
1936 establishments in Ireland
Railway stations in Northern Ireland opened in the 20th century